Eye for Eye is 1918 American silent drama film directed by Albert Capellani. It was produced by Richard A. Rowland and Alla Nazimova and distributed by Metro Pictures. Nazimova is also the star in a production scripted by June Mathis. A trailer of the film is currently held in the Library of Congress, and evidence has arisen that a copy may exist in Gosfilmofond in Russia.

Plot
As described in a film magazine, Arabs have captured the French Captain de Cadiere (Bryant), but he escapes with the help of Hassouna (Nazimova), a young Bedouin woman of the desert. She is abandoned to die by the irate sheik (Stern), is captured by marauders of the desert sands, and is sold in slavery to the manager of a small French circus. The Captain, at a show near a small town where his ship is anchored, finds the Bedouin woman and takes her to his home. After hearing that the Captain's detachment has killed all of her tribe in the desert, she vows vengeance upon the Frenchman. However, she fails in the execution of her threat due to his love for her.

Cast
Alla Nazimova as Hassouna
Charles Bryant as Captain de Cadiere
Donald Gallaher as Ensign Arnauld
Sally Crute as Madame Helene de Cadiere
E. L. Fernandez as Taieb
John Reinhardt as Paul Lecroix
Louis Stern as The Sheik
Charles Eldridge as Tootit, the Clown
Hardee Kirkland as Rambert, Circus Proprietor
Miriam Battista as Hassouna's Little Sister
William A. Cohill (unidentified role)
William T. Carleton (unidentified role)

uncredited
Anita Brown 
Barry Whitcomb

Reception
Like many American films of the time, Eye for Eye was subject to restrictions and cuts by city and state film censorship boards. For example, the Chicago Board of Censors required a cut, in Reel 3, of the kissing between the wife and her lover, Reel 4, the lover kissing the woman on her shoulder, kissing between the married woman and lover at door, Reel 7, the vision of the party, and the nude woman on the couch.

See also
The West (1938)

References

External links

Film still at silenthollywood.com]
lobby poster

1918 films
American black-and-white films
American silent feature films
Films directed by Albert Capellani
1918 romantic drama films
American romantic drama films
Films set in France
Films set in Algeria
Films set in the French colonial empire
Metro Pictures films
1910s American films
Silent romantic drama films
Silent American drama films